Cathedral Basilica may refer to:

Canada
 Mary, Queen of the World Cathedral, also known as the Cathedral-Basilica of Mary, Queen of the World, Quebec, Canada
 Notre-Dame Cathedral Basilica, Ottawa, Ontario, Canada
 Saint-Michel Basilica-Cathedral, also known as the Cathedral-Basilica of St. Michael, Quebec, Canada
 St. Joseph's Basilica, Edmonton, also known as the St. Joseph's Cathedral Basilica, Canada
 St. Mary's Basilica, Halifax, also known as the St. Mary's Cathedral Basilica, Canada

India
 San Thome Basilica, also known as the San Thome Cathedral Basilica, India
 Santa Cruz Basilica, also known as the Santa Cruz Cathedral Basilica, India
 St. Mary's Cathedral Basilica, Ernakulam, India

Italy
 Frascati Cathedral, also known as the Cathedral Basilica of St. Peter Apostle, Italy
 St Mark's Basilica, also known as the Patriarchal Cathedral Basilica of Saint Mark, Italy

Lithuania
 Kaunas Cathedral Basilica, Kaunas, Lithuania
 Vilnius Cathedral, the main Roman Catholic Cathedral of Lithuania

Poland
 Archcathedral Basilica of St. Peter and St. Paul, Poznań, also known as the Cathedral Basilica of St. Peter and St. Paul, Poznań, Poland
 Cathedral Basilica of St. James the Apostle, Szczecin, Poland
 Cathedral Basilica of St. John the Baptist and St. John the Evangelist, Torun, Poland
 Gniezno Cathedral, also known as the Cathedral Basilica of the Assumption of the Blessed Virgin Mary, Gniezno, Poland
 Oliwa Cathedral, also known as the Cathedral Basilica of the Holy Trinity, Gdansk, Poland
 Pelplin Abbey, also known as the Cathedral Basilica of the Assumption of the Blessed Virgin Mary, Pelplin, Poland
 Sandomierz Cathedral, also known as the Cathedral Basilica of the Nativity of the Blessed Virgin Mary, Sandomierz, Poland
 St. John's Cathedral, Warsaw, also known as the Cathedral Basilica of St. John the Baptist, Warsaw, Poland
 St. Mary's Church, Gdansk, also known as the Cathedral Basilica of the Assumption of the Blessed Virgin Mary, Gdansk, Poland
 Wawel Cathedral, also known as the Cathedral Basilica of St. Stanislaus and St. Wenceslaus, Krakow, Poland

Spain
 Cathedral of Menorca, also known as the Cathedral Basilica of Menorca, Spain
 Cathedral of San Salvador, Oviedo, also known as the Metropolitan Cathedral Basilica of the Holy Saviour, Spain

U.S.
 Cathedral Basilica of the Immaculate Conception, Mobile, Alabama
 Cathedral Basilica of St. Joseph (San Jose), California
 Cathedral Basilica of the Immaculate Conception, Denver, Colorado
 Cathedral Basilica of St. Augustine, Florida
 Cathedral Basilica of the Assumption, Covington, Kentucky
 Cathedral Basilica of St. Louis, Missouri
 Cathedral Basilica of St. Francis of Assisi (Santa Fe), New Mexico
 Cathedral Basilica of the Sacred Heart, Newark, New Jersey
 Cathedral Basilica of St. James (Brooklyn), New York City
 Cathedral Basilica of Saints Peter and Paul, Philadelphia, Pennsylvania
 St. Anthony Cathedral, Beaumont, Texas, also known as the Saint Anthony Cathedral Basilica
 St. Mary's Cathedral Basilica, Galveston, Texas

Other countries
 Cathedral Basilica of Our Lady of the Rosary, Argentina
 St Patrick's Cathedral, Melbourne, also known as the  St. Patrick's Cathedral Basilica, Australia
 Cathedral of Salvador, also known as the Cathedral Basilica of Salvador, Brazil
 Lille Cathedral, also known as the Cathedral Basilica of Notre Dame de la Treille, France
 Speyer Cathedral, also known as the Imperial Cathedral Basilica of the Assumption and St. Stephen, Germany
 Cathedral Basilica of Our Lady of Seven Sorrows, Ghana
 St Peter's Cathedral Basilica, Kumasi, Ghana
 Dulce Nombre de Maria Cathedral Basilica, Guam
 Cathedral Basilica of the Holy Family, Nairobi, Kenya
 Cathedral Basilica of the Most Holy Trinity, Onitsha, Nigeria
 Cathedral Basilica of Our Lady, Rwanda
 Cathedral Basilica of the Immaculate Conception in Castries, Saint Lucia

See also
 Cathedral Basilica of St. Joseph (disambiguation), several
 Cathedral of the Immaculate Conception (disambiguation), several, also known as the Cathedral Basilica of the Immaculate Conception
 Basilica Cathedral (disambiguation)